Agni Paravai ( Fire bird) is a 2013 Indian Tamil-language soap opera that aired on Puthuyugam TV from 4 November 2013 to 16 May 2014 on Monday through Friday at 8:30PM IST. The show stars Simran, Madhumila, Manush, Dr. Sharmila and  Directed by Kavithabharathi, based on a true story. The show last aired on 16 May 2014 and ended with 134 episodes. It also aired in Malaysia Tamil Channel on Astro Vaanavil.

Plot
Simran plays Madhavi, who is a professor in a reputed college and is of forty years age. She is a widow and goes for a vacation holidays from the college for a while. While she returns from the semester holidays, to everybody's surprise, she's found pregnant. Nobody knows the reason until she unveils it.

Cast
 Simran as Madhavi (Episode: 01-69, dead)
 Madhumila
 Venkat Renganathan
 Manush
 Dr. Sharmila
 Balambika
 Mahesh
 Ravikanth
 Venkatesh
 Deepa Shankar
 Sri Kala
 Saakshi Siva as Madhavi Husband (cameo role)

International broadcast
The Series was released on 4 November 2013 on Puthuyugam TV. The Show was also broadcast internationally on Channel's international distribution.
  In Singapore Tamil Channel on V Thamizh HD It aired Monday through Friday at 9:00PM.
  In Malaysia Tamil Channel on Astro Vaanavil. It aired Monday through Friday at 5:30PM.
 It was aired in United States, Europe and Australia on Athavan TV.

References

External links
 Puthuyugam TV on YouTube

Puthuyugam TV television series
2010s Tamil-language television series
2013 Tamil-language television series debuts
Tamil-language television shows
2014 Tamil-language television series endings